Elieser Wattebosi (born 20 August 1964) is an Indonesian sprinter. He competed in the men's 400 metres at the 1988 Summer Olympics.

References

1964 births
Living people
Athletes (track and field) at the 1988 Summer Olympics
Indonesian male sprinters
Olympic athletes of Indonesia
Place of birth missing (living people)
Southeast Asian Games medalists in athletics
Southeast Asian Games gold medalists for Indonesia
Competitors at the 1993 Southeast Asian Games